The positions of Plenipotentiary on European Integration to the Regional Governor (Pełnomocnik Wojewody ds. Europejskich) were gradually established in Poland between 1996 and 1999 in all of Poland's then 49 regions, or voivodeships (województwa). This step was taken in the wake of Poland's 1994 application for membership in the European Union in order to prepare the Polish administration and society at large for the process of European integration and Poland's eventual joining the EU (which took place in 2004). In early 1996, Regional Governor of the Opole Voivodeship (Wojewoda Opolski), Ryszard Zembaczyński, appointed Tomasz Kamusella as the first-ever Plenipotentiary of this kind.

References 

Politics of Poland
1996 in the European Union